Silent Slaughter is a novel by Peter Beere published in 1985.

Plot summary
Silent Slaughter is a novel in which Beekay, a crook and coward appears in volume 3 of the 'Trauma 2020' series.

Reception
Dave Langford reviewed Silent Slaughter for White Dwarf #73, and stated that "It succeeds - conjuring up a smell that's a powerful antidote to books and TV series where violence is sanitized and good guys never get hurt, much."

Reviews
Review by Pauline Morgan (1986) in Fantasy Review, February 1986

References

1985 novels